IRDP can stand for:
  ICMP Router Discovery Protocol
  Independent Radio Drama Productions
  Institute of rural development planning
  Integrated rural development programestablished in 1978
 Iraq Research and Documentation Project (2002 - 2003).